Bjarne Sognnæs (born 14 August 1966) is a retired Norwegian football defender.

He started his childhood career in Hakadal IL. Joining Lillestrøm SK from Løvenstad FK at the age of 17, he was a one-club man on senior level from 1984 through 1995. He also represented Norway up until under-21 level.

After retiring he has served on Lillestrøm SK's administrative staff and board of directors.

References

1966 births
Living people
People from Nittedal
Norwegian footballers
Lillestrøm SK players
Eliteserien players
Association football defenders
Norway youth international footballers
Norway under-21 international footballers
Lillestrøm SK non-playing staff
Norwegian sports executives and administrators